Sir Grey Skipwith, 8th Baronet (17 September 1771 – 13 May 1852) was an English Whig politician from Warwickshire.

He was the eldest son of Sir Peyton Skipwith, 7th Baronet  (died 1805), of Mecklenburg County, Virginia.  His mother Anne, was the daughter of Hugh Miller of Grenock, Blandford, Virginia.

Skipwith was educated at Eton College and at Trinity College, Cambridge. In 1801 he married Harriett, the daughter of Gore Townsend of Honington Hall, Warwickshire and granddaughter of the 4th Earl of Plymouth; they had 12 sons and 8 daughters. His younger brothers inherited his father's estates in Virginia, but Grey inherited the estates of his relative Sir Thomas Skipwith, 4th Baronet, including Newbold Revel.

At the 1831 general election he was elected as a Member of Parliament (MP) for Warwickshire. When the county was divided in 1832 he was elected for the new Southern division of Warwickshire. He stood down in 1835, and then unsuccessfully contested two by-elections: South Warwickshire in 1836 and North Warwickshire in 1837.

References

External links 
 

1771 births
1852 deaths
Baronets in the Baronetage of England
People from Stratford-on-Avon District
People educated at Eton College
Alumni of Trinity College, Cambridge
Members of the Parliament of the United Kingdom for English constituencies
UK MPs 1831–1832
UK MPs 1832–1835